

Max Ulich (25 March 1896 – 27 May 1964) was a German general during World War II who commanded the 212 Volksgrenadier-Division. He was a recipient of the Knight's Cross of the Iron Cross of Nazi Germany.

Awards and decorations
 Iron Cross (1939) 2nd Class & 1st Class
 German Cross in Gold (8 June 1942)
 Knight's Cross of the Iron Cross on  2 November 1943 as Oberst and commander of Grenadier-Regiment 15

References

Citations

Bibliography

 
 
 

1896 births
1964 deaths
German Army personnel of World War I
Prussian Army personnel
Military personnel from Berlin
Recipients of the Gold German Cross
Recipients of the Knight's Cross of the Iron Cross
Major generals of the German Army (Wehrmacht)
20th-century Freikorps personnel
Reichswehr personnel
People from the Province of Brandenburg
Recipients of the clasp to the Iron Cross, 1st class
German Army generals of World War II